Frank Viola (born October 12, 1964) is an American author, speaker, and blogger on Christian topics. His work focuses on Jesus studies and biblical narrative, with a strong emphasis on helping the poor and the oppressed. He is most noted for his emphasis on the gospel of the kingdom, the centrality and supremacy of Jesus Christ,
and the idea that Jesus indwells all Christians and they can learn to live by his life.

Viola's early work was focused on organic church and missional church themes. His older books advocated church life based on the spiritual principles of the New Testament,  the headship of Christ, face-to-face community,  and the priesthood of all believers.

Since 2009, Viola's work has been focused on Jesus studies, living by the indwelling life of Christ,  God's eternal purpose, the present-day ministry of Christ, and biblical narrative.
Viola has authored over 20 books, over 1,000 blog articles, and over 200 podcast episodes. His podcast, Christ is All, has been ranked #1 in Canada and #2 in the USA (respectively) in the "Christianity" section of iTunes.

His blog, Beyond Evangelical, is regularly ranked in the top 10 of Christian blogs on the Web.

Viola and professor Leonard Sweet have written three books together, each focusing on Christology: Jesus Speaks, Jesus: A Theography and Jesus Manifesto.

Since 2012, Viola has been strongly focused on helping the poor and the oppressed. Concerning the poor, Viola has said that helping those who are in need is part of "the Magna Carta of the Church of Jesus Christ as she continues the ministry of Jesus on earth (Luke 4:18–19). Scripture, both Old Testament and New Testament, make clear that this is very much on God's heart."

Aside from being an author and speaker on Christian topics, Viola consults authors, bloggers, and writers in their craft. He lectures throughout the USA and around the world, having spoken in various locations including Canada, Ireland, South Africa, Chile, Argentina, Germany, Switzerland, and Holland.

Bibliography
48 Laws of Spiritual Power, 2022, Tyndale Momentum 
Hang On, Let Go, 2021, Tyndale Momentum 
ReGrace, 2019, Baker Books 
Insurgence, 2018, Baker Books 
The Day I Met Jesus (with Mary DeMuth), 2015, Baker Books 
Jesus Now, 2014, David C. Cook 
God's Favorite Place on Earth, 2013, David C. Cook 
Revise Us Again, 2011, David C. Cook 
Jesus Manifesto (with Leonard Sweet), 2010, Thomas Nelson Inc 
Jesus: A Theography (with Leonard Sweet, 2012, Thomas Nelson Inc 
Jesus Speaks (with Leonard Sweet), 2016, Thomas Nelson 
From Eternity to Here, 2009, David C. Cook 
Finding Organic Church, 2009, David C. Cook 
Reimagining Church, 2008, David C Cook 
Pagan Christianity (with George Barna), 2008, Tyndale Momentum

See also
House Church
Missional
Simple church

References

External links
Official Website
Christ is All podcast
The Insurgence podcast

Living people
American evangelicals
Missional Christianity
Christian bloggers
1964 births